Martin Stern Jr. (April 9, 1917 - July 28, 2001) was an American architect who was most widely known for his large scale designs and structures in Las Vegas, Nevada.  He is credited with originating the concept of the structurally integrated casino resort complex in Las Vegas.

High-rising Las Vegas

Martin Stern Jr. designed the International Hotel, which later became the Las Vegas Hilton, and the first MGM Grand Hotel and Casino, two pivotal Martin Stern Jr. projects with entrepreneur Kirk Kerkorian in 1969 and 1973, which set the pace for the transformation of Las Vegas from a low-rise sprawl  of motels, clubs and parking lots into an extravagant high-rise metropolis.

The Daily Telegraph (London) wrote of the first Stern and Kerkorian project in its September 2001 eulogy  to Stern: "The International, whose tri-form 30-floor tower contained 1,519 rooms and became the most imitated building on the Las Vegas Strip, provided the model for the Bellagio, Treasure Island, Mirage and Mandalay Bay, among other hotels."  When it was completed, the International was the largest hotel in the world.

The first MGM Grand, with more square footage than the Empire State Building  and in its turn the largest hotel in the world, burned in 1980 in what is considered the worst disaster in Nevada state history.  As the Telegraph observed, this loss only seven years after the hotel was completed was devastating to Stern.  The MGM Grand was nonetheless rebuilt within eight months and reopened.  It was sold in 1985 and is now Bally's Las Vegas.

Construction magnate Del Webb was another major client with whom Stern worked on many projects, including twenty years of elaborate stages of expansion of the Sahara Hotel and Casino between 1963 and 1983.

Commissions
The extensive Lied Library and Architecture Studies Library inventories   of the University of Nevada, Las Vegas Department of Special Collections   document more than one hundred Martin Stern Jr. projects between 1951 and 1989, several of which — including the near-legendary Xanadu envisioned in 1975 — were never built. Dreaming the Skyline: Resort Architecture and the New Urban Space is an online collection from UNLV Libraries Digital Collections that includes several hundred images of Stern's work, including architectural plans and photographs.

Nearly half of Martin Stern Jr.'s projects were in Nevada while another quarter were in California.  The rest were in other states including Arizona, Hawaii, Illinois, New Jersey, New York, Oregon, Texas, and Utah, and in at least three other countries: Australia, Japan, and Slovenia, which was then part of Yugoslavia.

The following partial listing by decades sketches less than one third of Stern's work.

1950s
1951: 10401 Wilshire Apartment Building, Los Angeles, California
1954: Clark Market, Torrance, California
1955: Encino Village, a subdivision of 400 homes in Encino, Los Angeles, California.
1955: Holiday Hotel Reno in Reno, Nevada - the birthplace of the World Series of Poker.
1958-61: Mountain Shadows (later a Marriott resort) in Scottsdale, Arizona (Demolished)
1959: Del Webb's Towne House, on Market between 7th and 8th Streets in San Francisco, California. (Demolished)
1959 Sahara Hotel (Tunis Tower), Las Vegas, Nevada

1960s

1960: Paradise Valley Country Club, Paradise Valley, Arizona
1963: Ship's Coffee Shop, Los Angeles, California, in the space age Googie style which The New York Times credited Stern with pioneering.
1963: Beverly Hills, California Public Library.
1963: Sahara Hotel, (Alexandra Tower), Las Vegas.
1963: Harvey's Lake Tahoe (Mountain Tower)
1964: The Mint (tower addition), Las Vegas
1964: Ka'anapali Beach Hotel, Maui, Hawaii
1964: Del Webb's Ocean House (later acquired by Hilton Hotels) in Mission Bay, San Diego, California.
1965: Sahara Tahoe Hotel
1965: Sands Hotel (tower and renovation) Las Vegas, (Demolished)
1966: The Silver Slipper Hotel, known for its giant rotating rooftop silver slipper, Las Vegas.  Purchased in 1968 by Howard Hughes.
1969: King's Castle (later the Tahoe Hyatt) in Incline Village, Nevada
1969: International Hotel, with Kirk Kirkorian.  The International Hotel was purchased by the Hilton Hotels Corporation in 1970 and renamed the Las Vegas Hilton in 1971.

1970s

1970: Kuilima Hotel and Golf Course, North Shore Oahu at Kahuku, Hawaii (originally a Del Web Resort; later known as the Turtle Bay Resort)
1971: Harold's Club Reno
1971: Little America Hotels in Paradise Valley, Flagstaff and Tucson, Arizona and in Salt Lake City, Utah.
1973: MGM Grand Hotel and Casino with Kirk Kirkorian.  Rebuilt after the 1980 MGM Grand fire.  Sold in 1986 and reopened as Bally's Las Vegas.
1974: Las Vegas Hilton Benihana Village (addition).
1974: Riviera Hotel (Monte Carlo Tower), Las Vegas, (Demolished)
1975-79: The Mint Las Vegas - now part of Binion's Gambling Hall and Hotel
1978: Sahara Hotel (Tangiers Tower), Las Vegas
1979: Rainbow Plaza Resort Hotel, Niagara Falls, New York
1979: The D Las Vegas Resort
1979: Ibusuki Hotel, Ibusuki, Kagoshima, Japan

1980s
1982: Breakwater Island Resort Queensland, Australia
1982: Valley Bank, Spring Valley, Nevada
1985: Nova Gorica Hotel/Casino, Nova Gorica, Slovenia
1986: Darling Harbour Hotel, Darling Harbour, New South Wales, Australia
1986: Harvey's Lake Tahoe (Lake Tower)
1987: Embassy Suites Hotel, South Lake Tahoe, California
1988: Rivera Hotel (Monaco Tower), Las Vegas, (Demolished)
1988: Normandie Club, Gardena, California

1990s 

 1990: Flamingo Hotel (tower renovation), Las Vegas
 1991: Stardust Hotel (West Tower), Las Vegas (Demolished)

References

1917 births
2001 deaths
20th-century American architects
People from the Las Vegas Valley
Architects from Nevada